Madison Keys was the defending champion, but withdrew due to a wrist injury.

Mihaela Buzărnescu won her first WTA Tour singles title, defeating Maria Sakkari in the final, 6–1, 6–0.

Seeds 
The top four seeds received a bye into the second round.

Note: Aryna Sabalenka, who would have been placed in the entry list on the initial entry cutoff date of June 18, 2018 and seeded 7th, entered late and played the qualifying tournament. But she was eliminated in qualifying matches.

Draw

Finals

Top half

Bottom half

Qualifying

Seeds

Qualifiers

Lucky losers

Qualifying draw

First qualifier

Second qualifier

Third qualifier

Fourth qualifier

External links 
 Main draw
 Qualifying draw

2018 US Open Series
2018 WTA Tour
2018 Singles